Tamer Salah Ali Abdu Bayoumi  (Arabic:) (born 12 April 1982) is an Egyptian taekwondo athlete who won a bronze medal in the 58 kg weight class at the 2004 Summer Olympics after defeating Juan Antonio Ramos of Spain.

See also
Egypt at the 2004 Summer Olympics

External links
See Tamer Bayoumi in the Taekwondo Hall of Fame

1982 births
Living people
Egyptian male taekwondo practitioners
Olympic taekwondo practitioners of Egypt
Taekwondo practitioners at the 2004 Summer Olympics
Taekwondo practitioners at the 2012 Summer Olympics
Olympic bronze medalists for Egypt
Olympic medalists in taekwondo
Medalists at the 2004 Summer Olympics
World Taekwondo Championships medalists
21st-century Egyptian people